Aquaria is the plural of aquarium.

Aquaria may also refer to:

 Aquaria KLCC, an oceanarium in Kuala Lumpur, Malaysia
 Aquaria (video game), released in 2007
 Aquaria (drag queen), stage name of Giovanni Palandrani
 Aquaria (album), a 2015 album by Boots
 Aquaria (album), a 2022 album by Doda

See also
 List of aquaria